Blind equalization is a digital signal processing technique in which the transmitted signal is inferred (equalized) from the received signal, while making use only of the transmitted signal statistics. Hence, the use of the word blind in the name.

Blind equalization is essentially blind deconvolution applied to digital communications. Nonetheless, the emphasis in blind equalization is on online estimation of the equalization filter, which is the inverse of the channel impulse response, rather than the estimation of the channel impulse response itself. This is due to blind deconvolution common mode of usage in digital communications systems, as a means to extract the continuously transmitted signal from the received signal, with the channel impulse response being of secondary intrinsic importance.

The estimated equalizer is then convolved with the received signal to yield an estimation of the transmitted signal.

Problem statement

Noiseless model 
Assuming a linear time invariant channel with impulse response , the noiseless model relates the received signal  to the transmitted signal  via

The blind equalization problem can now be formulated as follows; Given the received signal , find a filter , called an equalization filter, such that

The solution  to the blind equalization problem is not unique. In fact, it may be determined only up to a signed scale factor and an arbitrary time delay. That is, if  are estimates of the transmitted signal and channel impulse response, respectively, then  give rise to the same received signal  for any real scale factor  and integral time delay .

Noisy model
In the noisy model, an additional term, representing additive noise, is included. The model is therefore

Algorithms
Many algorithms for the solution of the blind equalization problem have been suggested over the years.
However, as one usually has access to only a finite number of samples from the received signal , further restrictions must be imposed over the above models to render the blind equalization problem tractable.
One such assumption, common to all algorithms described below is to assume that the channel has finite impulse response, where  is an arbitrary natural number.

This assumption may be justified on physical grounds, since the energy of any real signal must be finite, and therefore its impulse response must tend to zero. Thus it may be assumed that all coefficients beyond a certain point are negligibly small.

Minimum phase
If the channel impulse response is assumed to be minimum phase, the problem becomes trivial.

Bussgang methods
Bussgang methods make use of the Least mean squares filter algorithm

with

Polyspectra techniques
Polyspectra techniques utilize higher order statistics in order to compute the equalizer.

See also
Independent component analysis
Principal components analysis
Blind deconvolution
Linear predictive coding

References
[1] C. RICHARD JOHNSON, JR., et. el., "Blind Equalization Using the Constant Modulus Criterion: A Review", PROCEEDINGS OF THE IEEE, VOL. 86, NO. 10, OCTOBER 1998.

Telecommunication theory
Signal processing